MPA – The Association of Magazine Media is a nonprofit trade association for the magazine media industry. MPA was formerly known as Magazine Publishers Association until 2010.

MPA is the industry trade association for multi-platform magazine media companies. Established in 1919, MPA represents 175 domestic magazine media companies with more than 900 titles, approximately 30 international companies, and more than 100 associate members. Staffed by magazine media specialists, MPA is headquartered in New York, New York, with a government affairs office in Washington, DC.

MPA hosts an annual conference, known as AMMC or the American Magazine Media Conference, for magazine media professionals. During the conference, media professionals discuss the future of the magazine media industry, both print and digital, including challenges and opportunities.

In July 2022, MPA – The Association of Magazine Media and the News Media Alliance have merged to create the News/Media Alliance, "a nonprofit organization representing more than 2,000 news and magazine media organizations and their multiplatform businesses in the United States and globally."

Publishers Information Bureau
MPA administers the Publishers Information Bureau (PIB), which releases consumer magazine advertising data on a monthly basis. PIB data is a trusted source of data for many news organizations, and is used to report on the state of the consumer magazine industry.

Awards
Annually MPA and the American Society of Magazine Editors (ASME) host the National Magazine Awards known as The Ellies.

References

Organizations established in 1919
Magazine publishing
Publishing organizations
Trade associations based in the United States